Omalonyx matheroni is a species of air-breathing land snail, a terrestrial pulmonate gastropod mollusc in the family Succineidae, the amber snails.

Distribution
The distribution of Omalonyx matheroni includes:

The Lesser Antilles, West Indies:
 Dominica - introduced. There are slight differences in mantle pattern (often a diagnostic feature in some succineids) compared to typical Omalonyx matheroni. Further work is needed to establish the taxonomic position of the material from Dominica.
 Trinidad

and
 South America

References
This article incorporates CC-BY-3.0 text from the reference.

Succineidae